This is a list of people on the postage stamps of Djibouti and its precursors.

Obock (1892-1894) 

No identifiable persons are depicted on the postage stamps of Obock.

Djibouti (1893-1902) 

No identifiable persons are depicted on the postage stamps of the French colony of Djibouti.

French Somali Coast (1902-1967) 

 Governor Bernard, Colonial administrator who died in 1935 (1960) 
 Diane de Poitiers (1937) 
 Félix Éboué (1945) 
 Léonce Lagarde (1938)

French Territory of the Afars and Issas (1967-1977) 

 Clément Ader (1975) 
 André-Marie Ampère (1975) 
 Alexander Graham Bell (1976) 
 Albert Calmette, scientist (1972) 
 Nicolaus Copernicus (1973) 
 Marie Curie (1974) 
 Charles de Gaulle, French statesman (1971) 
 Thomas Edison (1977) 
 Henri Farman (1974) 
 Camille Guérin, scientist (1972) 
 Edward Jenner (1973) 
 Robert Koch (1973) 
 Guglielmo Marconi (1974) 
 Michelangelo (1975) 
 Molière (1973) 
 Louis Pasteur, scientist (1972) 
 Wilhelm Röntgen (1973) 
 Alessandro Volta (1977)

Djibouti 

This list is complete through 1998.

 Hassan Gouled Aptidon, president (1978) 
 Robert Baden-Powell (1982) 
 Alexander Graham Bell (1977, as an overprint on a stamp of the French Territory of the Afars and Issas) 
 Louis Blériot (1984) 
 Charles, Prince of Wales (1981) 
 Christopher Columbus, explorer (1991) 
 James Cook, explorer (1980) 
 Marie Curie, scientist (1984) 
 Pierre Curie, scientist (1984) 
 Pierre de Coubertin, Olympics founder (1987) 
 Charles de Gaulle, French statesman (1990) 
 Diana, Princess of Wales (1981) 
 Thomas Edison (1977, as an overprint on a stamp of the French Territory of the Afars and Issas) 
 Alexander Fleming, penicillin discoverer (1980) 
 Yuri Gagarin (1981) 
 Galileo Galilei (1984) 
 Mohandas Karamchand Gandhi, Leader of India's Independence Movement (1998) 
 John Glenn (1982) 
 Edmond Halley, scientist (1986) 
 Gerhard Armauer Hansen (1985) 
 Rowland Hill, postal reformer (1979) 
 Victor Hugo, novelist (1985) 
 Martin Luther King ("Jr." not shown on stamp) (1983) 
 Robert Koch (1982) 
 Charles Lindbergh (1987) 
 Samuel Morse (1987) 
 Horatio Nelson, admiral (1981) 
 Alfred Nobel (1983) 
 Louis Pasteur, scientist (1987) 
 Arthur Rimbaud, poet (1985)  (1992) 
 Peter Romanovsky (1980) 
 Franklin D. Roosevelt (1982) 
 Dick Rutan (1987) 
 Friedrich Sämisch (1980) 
 Alan Shepard (1981) 
 George Stephenson (1981) 
 Mother Teresa (1998) 
 Jules Verne, writer (1980) 
 Alessandro Volta (1977, as an overprint on a stamp of the French Territory of the Afars and Issas) 
 Ferdinand von Zeppelin (1980) 
 George Washington (1982) 
 Jeana Yeager (1987)

See also
Postage stamps and postal history of Djibouti

References

Stamps,people
Lists of people on postage stamps
Stamps,people